Severns Valley Baptist Church is a Baptist church located in Elizabethtown, Kentucky, USA. Founded by a group of eighteen people in June 1781, it was organized in Severns Valley (now Elizabethtown) and is Kentucky's oldest Baptist church. It has hosted events by performers such as Ricky Skaggs, The Crabb Family, pureNRG, and Vicky Courtney.

References

External links
Severns Valley Baptist Church website

Baptist churches in Kentucky
Elizabethtown, Kentucky
Churches in Hardin County, Kentucky